Clare Camille Johnson (born August 23, 1979), known professionally as Clare Grant,  is an American actress, model and producer. She co-founded Team Unicorn, which has produced several web series and music video parodies including "Geek and Gamer Girls" and "All About That Base".

Early life
Grant grew up in Memphis, Tennessee. She is of Irish, English, Scandinavian, and Native American descent. To support herself through college, Grant modeled through Elite Model Management on several campaigns, for companies such as L'Oréal.

Career

Film work
She had a small role in Walk the Line and has appeared in several independent films. Craig Brewer cast her as the lead in two of his indie films before casting her in the film Black Snake Moan as  Christina Ricci's best friend, and later as the lead in his MTV series $5 Cover. She then played the lead role of Megan Graves in comic book writer Brian Pulido's first independent feature film The Graves, followed by the role of Beverly in the film Joshua Tree, 1951: A Portrait of James Dean, directed by Matthew Mishory. In 2013, Grant played the lead role of Martha Collins in the film The Insomniac, directed by Monty Miranda, and voiced Black Widow in the Marvel Animation movie Iron Man: Rise of Technovore. In 2015, Clare played a supporting role in Phantom Halo and appeared in a holiday anthology movie called Holidays, a featured selection of the 2016 Tribeca Film Festival. She will appear in Changeland alongside Seth Green who wrote, directed, and also starred in the film.

Television work
Grant's first television role was in an episode of Masters of Horror, followed by the series lead role on the MTV series $5 Cover, about the trials and tribulations of the current Memphis music scene, created by Craig Brewer. Since then, Grant has appeared in guest starring roles on shows such as Castle, CSI: Miami and Warren the Ape. She does voices on Robot Chicken, MAD, originated a bounty hunter named Latts Razzi on Star Wars: The Clone Wars, and voices Titania on Hulk and the Agents of S.M.A.S.H. and Avengers Assemble.

In October 2006, she appeared as "Babe of the Month" in a non-nude pictorial in Playboy magazine.

In 2013, Adult Swim announced that Grant co-created and will be starring in and executive producing a pilot based on the webseries she co-created, Team Unicorn.

In 2020, she appeared as herself in the DC Universe unscripted gaming series DC Universe All Star Games.

Other projects 
Under their company Danger Maiden Productions, Grant and partner Rileah Vanderbilt produced the viral online series Saber. In 2010, the duo began working with Milynn Sarley & Michele Boyd to create the online series Team Unicorn. The team's first project, "G33k & G4m3r Girls" (a parody of Katy Perry's "California Gurls" video), paid tribute to their shared mutual passion of gaming, manga, and science fiction. It had over a million views in its first week, but met with some mixed responses to its portrayal of the women. 
This was followed by other viral videos, most notably "All About that Base", a parody of the hit song by Meghan Trainor with a Star Wars theme. Grant guest-starred in the second season of the Jane Espenson-scripted romantic comedy web series Husbands, and has made appearances on webseries such as The Guild, Save the Supers, Q.V.G., and Tabletop. In 2013, Grant starred as Mala in a Wonder Woman fan short film.

In the 2019 Fortnite World Cup Grant and her partner Jacob won 1st place in the second round of the Pro-AM Tournament, and 4th place overall, winning $100,000 for charity.

Personal life
Grant first met actor Seth Green in 2006 at the Golden Apple Comics. They married on May 1, 2010 at Skywalker Ranch; the ceremony was officiated by Grant's long-time friend and director, Craig Brewer.

Filmography

Film

Television series

Webseries

Music videos

Awards and nominations

References

External links

 
 

1979 births
21st-century American actresses
Actresses from Memphis, Tennessee
Actresses from Tennessee
American film actresses
American television actresses
American television producers
American women television producers
American people of English descent
American people of Irish descent
American people of Scandinavian descent
Female models from Tennessee
Living people
University of Memphis alumni
21st-century American singers
21st-century American women singers